The Pavilhão da Maria Fumaça (Steam Train Pavilion) is a tourist attraction in Guarujá, Brazil. It houses the steam locomotive that took tourists from a station in the Itapema estuary to the front of the Grande Hotel on Pitangueiras beach. At the end of the 1910s, the branch on which the aforementioned steam locomotive - "Maria Fumaça" - was deactivated and a highway was built. Until 2017, the Maria Fumaça pavilion was symmetrically paired with the Santos-Dumont hearse pavilion, but in 2017 the city council chose to remove the car from the pavilion.

References 

Steam locomotives of Brazil
Tourist attractions in São Paulo (state)
Baixada Santista